Joshekan was a small province of Qajar dynasty Persia covering about .
 
Under the Safavid dynasty, the region was called Meimeh, and the tax collector resided in the large village of Joshekan-Kali. Under the Qajar dynasty, the province of Joshekan was created as a fiefdom for Bahram Mirza Moezz-od-Dowleh Qajar. Upon his death in 1882 it passed to his son Ism'ail Mirza Moezz-od-Dowleh. It was later incorporated into Isfahan Province of modern Iran.

Joshekan took its name from the village of Joshekan-Kali, once known for its wool production and carpet-making. The word kali from its name means carpet. Later, the governor's residence was moved to Meimeh, a smaller city situated at an elevation of 6670 ft.

References 

Former provinces of Iran
Isfahan Province